Daniel Gilbert may refer to:

 Daniel Gilbert (psychologist) (born 1957), American psychology professor
 Dan Gilbert (born 1962), US businessman, majority owner of the Cleveland Cavaliers
 Daniel Gilbert (basketball) (born 1983), American basketball player